The 1943 Pittsburgh Panthers football team represented the University of Pittsburgh in the 1943 college football season.  The team compiled a 3–5 record under new head coach Clark Shaughnessy.

At the start of the season, Shaughnessy introduced red and white uniforms that departed from the team's traditional blue and gold color scheme. The team reverted to blue and gold in late 1945.

Schedule

References

Pittsburgh
Pittsburgh Panthers football seasons
Pittsburgh Panthers football